The 1907 Svenska Mästerskapet was the twelfth season of Svenska Mästerskapet, the football Cup to determine the Swedish champions. Örgryte IS won the tournament by defeating IFK Uppsala in the final with a 4–1 score.

First round

Quarter-finals

Semi-finals

Final

References 

Print

1907
Svenska
Mas